The Canigiani Holy Family or Canigiani Madonna is an oil on wood painting by the Italian High Renaissance artist Raphael, executed circa 1507–1508.

It shows mainly (l.t.r.) Elisabeth with baby John the Baptist, Joseph and Mary with infant baby Jesus. These figures of the New Testament maintain eye contact. The oil painting was bought from the painter by the Canigiani family in Florence for their Home altar.

It is part of the permanent collection of the Alte Pinakothek in Munich, Germany.

See also
List of paintings by Raphael

Notes

References

 Official website

External links

Paintings by Raphael
Collection of the Alte Pinakothek
1508 paintings
Paintings depicting John the Baptist
Raphael
Nude art
Altarpieces